John Laudun is a folklorist, essayist, and professor at University of Louisiana at Lafayette.

He focuses on creativity across a broad range of media and behaviors. 
He has published widely in scholarly journals, anthologies, and has a book forthcoming, but he has also reached out to broader audiences with essays in various outlets, including his own website. He has appeared on camera in several films and been interviewed by the New York Times and the Atlanta Constitution, among others.

Education and career 
Born in Lafayette, Louisiana and raised in Lafayette, Franklin, and Baton Rouge, he graduated from  Louisiana State University with a dual degree in philosophy and English in 1986. He received a master's of art in English from Syracuse University in 1989, where he developed his interest in folklore studies based on his reading of post-structuralist theories. Laudun obtained a doctorate in folkloristics from Indiana University in 1999, where he studied under Richard Bauman and Henry Glassie.

As he was finishing up work on his dissertation, he was offered a position at the University of Louisiana at Lafayette, where he joined the English faculty, where he embarked upon a number of efforts, including editing the Louisiana Folklore Miscellany, published by the Louisiana Folklore Society, from 2000 to 2005.

Honors and awards 
While finishing up his undergraduate work at LSU, Laudun received a Jacob K. Javits Fellowship from the U.S. Department of Education to pursue graduate work in creativity. He was a Javits Fellow at both Syracuse University (1987–89) and Indiana University (1990–92). While at Syracuse, he received the Delmore Schwartz Prize for Poetry. At Indiana University, he was selected as a MacArthur Scholar for the Indiana Center for Global Change and World Peace.

Publications

Books

The Amazing Crawfish Boat (University Press of Mississippi, 2016) tells the story of how a bunch of Cajun and German farmers and fabricators invented a traditional amphibious boat.

Scholarly Essays

2019. TED Talks as Data. Journal of Cultural Analytics. https://culturalanalytics.org/2019/07/ted-talks-as-data/

2019. Trucks under Water: A Legend from the 2016 Flood. Louisiana Folklore Miscellany 28: 20–36.

2018. Tallying Treasure Tales: A Reconsideration of the Structure and Nature of Local Legends. Contemporary Legend 3(7): 1-27.

2014. Counting Tales: Towards a Computational Approach to Folk Narrative. Folk Culture Forum 5/228: 20–35. Translator (to Chinese): An Deming.

--- and Jonathan Goodwin. 2013. Computing Folklore Studies. Mapping over a Century of Scholarly Production through Topics. Journal of American Folklore Vol. 126, No. 502 (Autumn 2013), pp. 455–475.

2012. "Talking Shit" in Rayne: How Aesthetic Features Reveal Ethical Structures. Journal of American Folklore Vol. 125, No. 497 (Summer 2012), pp. 304–326.

2011. A Constellation of Stars: The Study of Creativity on a Human Scale, or How a Bunch of Cajun and German Farmers and Fabricators in Louisiana Invented a Traditional Amphibious Boat. In The Individual in Tradition. Eds. Ray Cashman, Tom Mould, Pravina Shukla. Bloomington, IN: Indiana University Press.

2008. Gumbo This: The State of a Dish, in Acadians and Cajuns: The Politics and Culture of French Minorities in North America, 160-175. Ed. Ursula Mathis-Moser and Günter Bischof. Innsbruck, Austria: Innsbruck University Press.

2004. Reading Hurston Writing. African American Review 38(1): 45-60.

2001. Talk about the Past in a Midwestern Town: “It Was There At That Time.” Midwestern Folklore 27(2): 41-54.

2000. “There’s Not Much to Talk about When You’re Taking Pictures of Houses”: The Poetics of Vernacular Spaces. Southern Folklore 57(2):135-158.

Media Appearances
2006 - Louisiana Story (Laudun is one of three narrators and appears in the film).

See also
 Folklore of the United States

Footnotes

External links 
 

https://web.archive.org/web/20120112155813/http://www.southerngumbotrail.com/laudun.shtml
http://www.eviada.org/collection.cfm?mc=7&ctID=68

Syracuse University alumni
American male writers
American folklorists
Indiana University alumni
Living people
People from Lafayette, Louisiana
University of Louisiana at Lafayette faculty
Louisiana State University alumni
Year of birth missing (living people)